Reial Club Deportiu Espanyol de Barcelona, commonly known as RCD Espanyol, or simply as Espanyol, is a professional sports club based in Barcelona, Catalonia, Spain. During the 2016–17 campaign they competed in La Liga and the Copa del Rey.

Squad

Out on loan

Competitions

La Liga

League table

Results summary

Results by matchday

Matches

Copa del Rey

Round of 32

References

External links
 Official website 
 RCD Espanyol at La Liga 
 RCD Espanyol at UEFA 

RCD Espanyol seasons
Spanish football clubs 2016–17 season
Espanyol